This is a list of notable street photographers. Street photography is photography conducted for art or enquiry that presents unmediated chance encounters and random incidents within public places. Street photography does not need the backdrop of a street or even an urban environment. Though people are usually present, street photography may lack people and can be of an object or environment where the image projects a decidedly human character in facsimile or aesthetic.

Street photographers

 Jun Abe (1955–)
 Berenice Abbott (1898–1991)
 Christophe Agou (1969–2015)
 Daniel Arnold
 John Benton-Harris (1939–)
 Richard Bram (1952–)
 Lola Álvarez Bravo (1903–1993)
 Manuel Álvarez Bravo (1902–2002)
 Blake Andrews (1968–)
 Emmy Andriesse (1914–1953)
 Nobuyoshi Araki (1940–)
 Diane Arbus (1923–1971)
 Eugène Atget (1857–1927)
Alice Austen (1866–1952)
 Narelle Autio (1969–)
 Shirley Baker (1932–2014) 
 James Barnor (1929–)
 Ruth-Marion Baruch (1922–1997)
 Gianni Berengo Gardin (1930–)
 Lou Bernstein (1911–2005)
 Dimpy Bhalotia (1987-)
 Valentine Blanchard (1831–1901)
 Dorothy Bohm (1924–)
 Boogie (1969–)
David Bradford (1951–)
 Adrian Bradshaw (1964-)
 Bill Brandt (1904–1983)
 Brassaï (1899–1984)
 Giacomo Brunelli (1977–)
 Harry Callahan (1912–1999)
 Henri Cartier-Bresson (1908–2004)
 Vivian Cherry (1920–2019
 Mark Cohen (1943–)
 Joan Colom (1921–2017)
 Martha Cooper (1943–)
 Ted Croner (1922–2005)
 Bill Cunningham (1929–2016)
 Maciej Dakowicz (1976–)
 Bill Dane (1938–)
 Bruce Davidson (1933–)
 Peter Dench (1972–)
 Raymond Depardon (1942–)
 Philip-Lorca diCorcia (1951–)
 Robert Doisneau (1912–1994)
 Ken Domon (1909–1990)
 Don Donaghy (1936–2008)
 Terence Donovan (1936–1996)
 Eamonn Doyle (1969–)
 Carolyn Drake (1971–)
 Nikos Economopoulos (1953–)
 William Eggleston (1939–)
 Melanie Einzig (1967–)
 Alfred Eisenstaedt (1898–1995)
 Martin Elkort (1929–2016)
 Ed van der Elsken (1925–1990)
 Morris Engel (1918–2005)
 Elliott Erwitt (1928–)
 Walker Evans (1903–1975)
 Louis Faurer (1916–2001)
 Harold Feinstein (1931–2015)
 Jed Fielding  (1953–)
 Armet Francis (1945–)
 Robert Frank (1924–2019)
 Jill Freedman (1939–2019)
 Lee Friedlander (1934–)
 Cristina García Rodero (1949-)
 William Gedney (1932–1989)
 George Georgiou (1961–)
 David Gibson (1957–)
 Bruce Gilden (1946–)
 Shigeo Gochō (1946–1983)
 Henry Grant (1907–2004)
 Ken Grant (1967–)
 Michelle Groskopf
 Sid Grossman (1913–1955)
 Ara Güler (1928–2018)
 John Gutmann (1905–1998)
 George Hallett (1942–2020)
 Hiroshi Hamaya (1915–1999)
 Siegfried Hansen (1961–)
 John Harding (1940–)
 Tadahiko Hayashi (1918–1990)
 Dave Heath (1931–2016)
 Nigel Henderson (1917–1985)
 Anthony Hernandez (1947–)
 Fred Herzog (1930–2019)
 Fan Ho (1931–2016)
 Thomas Hoepker (1936–)
 Yasuhiro Ishimoto (1921–2012)
 Walter Joseph (1922–2003)
 James Jowers (1939–2009)
 Richard Kalvar (1944–)
 Osamu Kanemura (1964–)
 Peter Kayafas (1971–)
 Neil Kenlock (1950–)
 André Kertész (1894–1985)
 Hiroh Kikai (1945–2020)
 Ihei Kimura (1901–1974) 
 Keizō Kitajima (1954–)
 William Klein (1928–2022)
 Martin Kollar (1971–)
 Josef Koudelka (1938–)
 Seiji Kurata (1945–2020) 
 Kineo Kuwabara (1913–2007)
 Dorothea Lange (1895–1965)
 Sergio Larrain (1931–2012)
 Jacques-Henri Lartigue (1894–1986)
 Jens Olof Lasthein (1964–)
 Nikki S. Lee (1970–)
 Arthur Leipzig (1918–2014)
 Saul Leiter (1923–2013)
 Rebecca Lepkoff (1916–2014)
 Leon Levinstein (1910–1988)
 Helen Levitt (1913–2009)
 Feng Li (1971–)
 Jerome Liebling (1924–2011)
 David Lurie (1951–)
 Markéta Luskačová (1944–)
 Jon Luvelli (1979-)
 Danny Lyon (1942–)
 Vivian Maier (1926–2009)
 Jesse Marlow (1978–)
 Mary Ellen Mark (1940–2015)
 Roger Mayne (1929–2014)
 Paul McDonough (born 1941)
 Stephen McLaren
 Susan Meiselas (1948–)
 Jeff Mermelstein (1957–) 
 Joel Meyerowitz (1938–) 
 Xavier Miserachs (1937–1998)
 Lisette Model (1901–1983)
 Mimi Mollica (1975–)
 Daidō Moriyama (1938–)
 Shigeichi Nagano (1925–2019)
 Masatoshi Naitō (1938–)
 Charles Nègre (1820–1880)
 Horace Nicholls (1867–1941)
 Colin O'Brien (1940–2016)
 Hildegard Ochse (1935–1997)
 Takayuki Ogawa (1938–2008)
 Mitsugu Ōnishi (1952–)
 Catherine Opie (1961–)
 Ruth Orkin (1921–1985)
 Graham Ovenden (1943–)
 Homer Page (1918–1985)
 Trent Parke (1971–) 
 Martin Parr (1952–)
 Charlie Phillips (1944–)
 Gus Powell (1974–)
 Mark Powell (1968–) 
 Raghu Rai (1942–)
 Tony Ray-Jones (1941–1972)
 Marc Riboud (1923–2016)
 Henri Rivière (1864–1951)
 Willy Ronis (1910–2009)
 Paul Russell (1966–)
 Edward Linley Sambourne (1844–1910)
 Richard Sandler (born 1946)
 Boris Savelev (1948–) 
 Tazio Secchiaroli (1925–1998)
 Allan Sekula (1951–2013)
 Craig Semetko (1961–)
 Jamel Shabazz (1960–)
 Raghubir Singh (1942–1999)
 Aaron Siskind (1903–1991)
 Gary Mark Smith (1956–)
 David Solomons (1965–)
 Terry Spencer (1918–2009)
 Chris Steele-Perkins (1947–)
 Fred Stein (1909–1967) 
 Joel Sternfeld (1944–)
 Louis Stettner (1922–2016) 
 Alfred Stieglitz (1864–1946)
 Gary Stochl (1947–)
 Paul Strand (1890–1976)
 Beat Streuli (1957–)
 Christer Strömholm (1918–2002)
 Matt Stuart (1974–)
 Thomas Struth (1954–)
 Issei Suda (1940–2019)
 Wolfgang Suschitzky (1912–2016) 
 Michael Ernest Sweet (1979–) 
 Homer Sykes (1949–)
 Yutaka Takanashi (1935–)
 Takeyoshi Tanuma (1929–2022)
 Sam Tata (1911–2005)
 Elsa Thiemann (1910–1981)
 John Thomson (1837–1921)
 Wolfgang Tillmans (1968–)
 Alexey Titarenko (1962–)
 Toyoko Tokiwa (1928–2019)
 Lars Tunbjörk (1956–2015)
 Peter Turnley (1955–)
 Nick Turpin (1969–)
Stephan Vanfleteren (1969–)
 David Vestal (1924–2013)
 Roman Vishniac (1897–1990)
 Jeff Wall (1946–)
 Dougie Wallace (1953-)
 Munem Wasif (1983–)
 Alex Webb (1952–)
 Weegee (1899–1968)
 Henry Wessel (1942–2018)
 William Whiffin (1878–1957)
 Garry Winogrand (1928–1984)
 Ernest Withers (1922–2007)
 Michael Wolf (1954–2019) 
 Tom Wood (1951–)
 Michio Yamauchi (1950–)
 Nakaji Yasui (1903–1942)
 Yau Leung (1941–1997)
 Bernard Pierre Wolff (1930–1985)
 Max Yavno (1911–1985)
 Heinrich Zille (1858–1929)

See also

 List of photographers
 List of photojournalists

Notes

References

External links
 

Street photographers
Lists of photographers